Nijverdal is a railway station located in Nijverdal, the Netherlands. The station opened on 1 January 1881 and is located on the Zwolle–Almelo railway. Train services are operated by Keolis Nederland. Previously, this station was called Hellendoorn-Nijverdal(1881-1925) and Nijverdal Noord (1925-1935), to differentiate it from the then main Nijverdal station, located on the former Neede-Hellendoorn railway (1910-1935).

In recent years, works have been carried out around Nijverdal station in order to improve road and rail routes between Almelo and Zwolle. Between December 2009 and March 2013, direct services between Zwolle and Almelo were interrupted. Coming from Zwolle, trains terminated at a temporary station Nijverdal West. Shuttle buses transported passengers to Nijverdal station, from where a service to Almelo and Enschede operated.

Meanwhile, a new Nijverdal station was constructed. Continuous rail traffic was reinstated on 1 April 2013, serving the new station. The old Nijverdal station was closed, and the temporary station demolished.

Train services

Bus services

References

External links
NS website 
Dutch Public Transport journey planner 

Railway stations in Overijssel
Railway stations opened in 1881
Hellendoorn
1881 establishments in the Netherlands
Railway stations in the Netherlands opened in the 19th century